Halfdan Fredrik Jebe (3 November 1868 in Trondheim, Norway – 17 December 1937 in Mexico City, Mexico) was a Norwegian violinist, conductor and composer.

Jebe received his education in Oslo, Leipzig, Berlin, and Paris. Among his teachers were the violinist Joseph Joachim and the composer Jules Massenet. In Paris he became acquainted with artists like Edvard Munch, Vilhelm Krag, August Strindberg and Christian Sinding. He also befriended Frederick Delius and accompanied him to Florida in January 1897. Later he led the orchestra at the Delius Orchestral Concert under Hertz in London 30 May 1899, the first performance of Delius' orchestral music. After a year as conductor at Fahlstrøms Theater (Centralteatret) in Christiania, where he met his future wife Sofie Bernhoft, he left Europe 1901 and travelled extensively in Europe and Egypt. In 1902 and 1903 he visited India, Ceylon, China and Japan.

In January 1932 a concert with the Oslo Philharmonic Orchestra conducted by Olav Kielland and was dedicated to Jebe's works, notably the Symphony in A minor and parts of Loltun.

References 

1868 births
1937 deaths
Norwegian violinists
Norwegian composers
Norwegian male composers
Norwegian emigrants to Mexico